Instead of having a single "inventor", the Internet was developed by many people over many years. The following are some Internet pioneers who contributed to its early and ongoing development. These include early theoretical foundations, specifying original protocols, and expansion beyond a research tool to wide deployment.

The pioneers

Claude Shannon

Claude Shannon (1916–2001) called the "father of modern information theory", published "A Mathematical Theory of Communication" in 1948. His paper gave a formal way of studying communication channels. It established fundamental limits on the efficiency of communication over noisy channels, and presented the challenge of finding families of codes to achieve capacity.

Vannevar Bush

Vannevar Bush (1890–1974) helped to establish a partnership between U.S. military, university research, and independent think tanks. He was appointed Chairman of the National Defense Research Committee in 1940 by President Franklin D. Roosevelt, appointed Director of the Office of Scientific Research and Development in 1941, and from 1946 to 1947, he served as chairman of the Joint Research and Development Board. Out of this would come DARPA, which in turn would lead to the ARPANET Project. His July 1945 Atlantic Monthly article "As We May Think" proposed Memex, a theoretical proto-hypertext computer system in which an individual compresses and stores all of their books, records, and communications, which is then mechanized so that it may be consulted with exceeding speed and flexibility.

J. C. R. Licklider

Joseph Carl Robnett Licklider (1915–1990) was a faculty member of Massachusetts Institute of Technology, and researcher at Bolt, Beranek and Newman. He developed the idea of a universal network at the Information Processing Techniques Office (IPTO) of the United States Department of Defense Advanced Research Projects Agency (ARPA). He headed IPTO from 1962 to 1963, and again from 1974 to 1975. His 1960 paper "Man-Computer Symbiosis" envisions that mutually-interdependent, "living together", tightly coupled human brains and computing machines would prove to complement each other's strengths.

Paul Baran

Paul Baran (1926–2011) developed the field of redundant distributed networks while conducting research at RAND Corporation starting in 1959 when Baran began investigating the development of survivable communication networks. This led to a series of papers titled "On Distributed communications" that in 1964 described a detailed architecture for a distributed survivable packet switched communications network. In 2012, Baran was inducted into the Internet Hall of Fame by the Internet Society.

Donald Davies

Donald Davies (1924–2000) independently invented and named the concept of packet switching in 1965 at the United Kingdom's National Physical Laboratory (NPL). In the same year, he proposed a national data network based on packet switching in the UK. After the proposal was not taken up nationally, during 1966 he headed a team which produced a design for a local area network to serve the needs of NPL and prove the feasibility of packet switching. He and his team were the first to describe the use of an "Interface computer" to act as a router in 1966; one of the first to use the term 'protocol' in a data-commutation context in 1967; and also carried out simulation work on packet networks, including datagram networks.

In 1967, a written version of the proposal entitled NPL Data Network was presented by a member of his team (Roger Scantlebury) at the inaugural Symposium on Operating Systems Principles. Scantlebury suggested packet switching for use in the ARPANET; Larry Roberts incorporated it into the design and sought input from Paul Baran. Davies gave the first public presentation on packet switching in 1968 and built the local area NPL network in England, influencing other research in the UK and Europe. The NPL network and the ARPANET were the first two networks in the world to use packet switching and NPL was the first to use high-speed links. In 2012, Davies was inducted into the Internet Hall of Fame by the Internet Society.

Charles M. Herzfeld

Charles M. Herzfeld (1925–2017) was an American scientist and scientific manager, best known for his time as Director of DARPA, during which, among other things, he personally took the decision to authorize the creation of the ARPANET, the predecessor of the Internet.

In 2012, Herzfeld was inducted into the Internet Hall of Fame by the Internet Society.

Bob Taylor

Robert W. Taylor (10 February 1932 – 13 April 2017) was director of ARPA's Information Processing Techniques Office from 1965 through 1969, where he convinced ARPA to fund a computer network. From 1970 to 1983, he managed the Computer Science Laboratory of the Xerox Palo Alto Research Center (PARC), where technologies such as Ethernet and the Xerox Alto were developed. He was the founder and manager of Digital Equipment Corporation's Systems Research Center until 1996. The 1968 paper, "The Computer as a Communication Device", that he wrote together with J.C.R. Licklider starts out: "In a few years, men will be able to communicate more effectively through a machine than face to face." And while their vision would take more than "a few years", the paper lays out the future of what the Internet would eventually become.

Larry Roberts

Lawrence G. "Larry" Roberts (1937–2018) was an American computer scientist. After earning his PhD in electrical engineering from MIT in 1963, Roberts continued to work at MIT's Lincoln Laboratory where in 1965 he connected Lincoln Lab's TX-2 computer to the SDC Q-32 computer in Santa Monica. In 1967, he became a program manager in the ARPA Information Processing Techniques Office (IPTO), where he led the development of the ARPANET, the first wide area packet switching network. Roberts applied Donald Davies' concepts of packet switching for the ARPANET, and also sought input from Paul Baran. He asked Leonard Kleinrock to measure and model the network's performance. After Robert Taylor left ARPA in 1969, Roberts became director of the IPTO. In 1973, he left ARPA to commercialize the nascent technology in the form of Telenet, the first data network utility, and served as its CEO from 1973 to 1980. In 2012, Roberts was inducted into the Internet Hall of Fame by the Internet Society.

Leonard Kleinrock

Leonard Kleinrock (born 1934) published his first paper on queueing theory, "Information Flow in Large Communication Nets", in 1961. After completing his Ph.D. thesis in 1962, in which he applied queuing theory to message switching, he moved to UCLA. In 1969, under his supervision, a team at UCLA connected a computer to an Interface Message Processor, becoming the first node on ARPANET. Building on his earlier work on queueing theory, Kleinrock carried out theoretical work to model the performance of packet-switched networks, which underpinned the development of the ARPANET. His theoretical work on hierarchical routing in the late 1970s with student Farouk Kamoun remains critical to the operation of the Internet today. In 2012, Kleinrock was inducted into the Internet Hall of Fame by the Internet Society.

Bob Kahn

Robert E. "Bob" Kahn (born 1938) is an American engineer and computer scientist, who in 1974, along with Vint Cerf, invented the TCP/IP protocols. After earning a Ph.D. degree from Princeton University in 1964, he worked for AT&T Bell Laboratories, as an assistant professor at MIT, and at Bolt, Beranek and Newman (BBN), where he helped develop the ARPANET IMP. In 1972, he began work at the Information Processing Techniques Office (IPTO) within ARPA. In 1986 he left ARPA to found the Corporation for National Research Initiatives (CNRI), a nonprofit organization providing leadership and funding for research and development of the National Information Infrastructure.

Douglas Engelbart

Douglas Engelbart (1925–2013) was an early researcher at the Stanford Research Institute. His Augmentation Research Center laboratory became the second node on the ARPANET in October 1969, and SRI became the early Network Information Center, which evolved into the domain name registry.

Engelbart was a committed, vocal proponent of the development and use of computers and computer networks to help cope with the world's increasingly urgent and complex problems. He is best known for his work on the challenges of human–computer interaction, resulting in the invention of the computer mouse, and the development of hypertext, networked computers, and precursors to graphical user interfaces.

Elizabeth Feinler

Elizabeth J. "Jake" Feinler (born 1931) was a staff member of Doug Engelbart's Augmentation Research Center at SRI and PI for the Network Information Center (NIC) for the ARPANET and the Defense Data Network (DDN) from 1972 until 1989. In 2012, Feinler was inducted into the Internet Hall of Fame by the Internet Society.

Louis Pouzin

Louis Pouzin (born 1931) is a French computer scientist. He built the first implementation of a datagram packet communications network, CYCLADES, that demonstrated the feasibility of internetworking, which he called a "catenet". Concepts from his work were used by Robert Kahn, Vinton Cerf, and others in the development of TCP/IP. In 1997, Pouzin received the ACM SIGCOMM Award for "pioneering work on connectionless packet communication". Louis Pouzin was named a Chevalier of the Legion of Honor by the French government on 19 March 2003. In 2012, Pouzin was inducted into the Internet Hall of Fame by the Internet Society.

John Klensin

John Klensin's involvement with Internet began in 1969, when he worked on the File Transfer Protocol. 
Klensin was involved in the early procedural and definitional work for DNS administration and top-level domain definitions and was part of the committee that worked out the transition of DNS-related responsibilities between USC-ISI and what became ICANN.

His career includes 30 years as a principal research scientist at MIT, a stint as INFOODS Project Coordinator for the United Nations University, Distinguished Engineering Fellow at MCI WorldCom, and Internet Architecture Vice President at AT&T; he is now an independent consultant. In 1992 Randy Bush and John Klensin created the Network Startup Resource Center, helping dozens of countries to establish connections with FidoNet, UseNet, and when possible the Internet.

In 2003, he received an International Committee for Information Technology Standards Merit Award.
In 2007, he was inducted as a Fellow of the Association for Computing Machinery for contributions to networking standards and Internet applications. In 2012, Klensin was inducted into the Internet Hall of Fame by the Internet Society.

Vint Cerf

Vinton G. "Vint" Cerf (born 1943) is an American computer scientist. He is recognized as one of "the fathers of the Internet", sharing this title with Bob Kahn.

He earned his Ph.D. from UCLA in 1972. At UCLA he worked in Professor Leonard Kleinrock's networking group that connected the first two nodes of the ARPANET and contributed to the ARPANET host-to-host protocol. Cerf was an assistant professor at Stanford University from 1972 to 1976, where he conducted research on packet network interconnection protocols and co-designed the DoD TCP/IP protocol suite with Bob Kahn. He was a program manager for the Advanced Research Projects Agency (ARPA) from 1976 to 1982. Cerf was instrumental in the formation of both the Internet Society and Internet Corporation for Assigned Names and Numbers (ICANN), serving as founding president of the Internet Society from 1992 to 1995 and in 1999 as chairman of the board and as ICANN Chairman from 2000 to 2007. His many awards include the National Medal of Technology, the Turing Award, the Presidential Medal of Freedom, and membership in the National Academy of Engineering and the Internet Society's Internet Hall of Fame.

Yogen Dalal
Yogen K. Dalal, also known as Yogin Dalal, is an Indian electrical engineer and computer scientist. He was an ARPANET pioneer, and a key contributor to the development of internetworking protocols. He co-authored the first TCP specification, with Vint Cerf and Carl Sunshine between 1973 and 1974. It first used the term internet as a shorthand for internetworking, and later RFCs repeated this use. Dalal later proposed splitting TCP into the TCP and IP protocols between 1976 and 1977, leading to the development of TCP/IP. He also worked at Xerox PARC, where he contributed to the development of the Ethernet, the Xerox Network Systems (XNS), and the Xerox Star.

After receiving a B.Tech in Electrical Engineering at the Indian Institute of Technology Bombay, he went to the United States to study for a master's degree at Stanford University in 1972 and then a PhD in 1973. His interest in data communication as a graduate student led him to working with new professor Vint Cerf as a teaching assistant in 1972, and then as a research assistant while studying for his PhD. In Summer 1973, while Cerf and Bob Kahn were attempting to formulate an internetworking protocol, Dalal joined their research team to assist them on developing what eventually became TCP. After co-authoring the first TCP protocol with Cerf and Sunshine in 1974, Dalal received his PhD in Electrical Engineering and Computer Science, and remained active in the development of TCP/IP at Stanford for several years. Between 1976 and 1977, Dalal proposed separating TCP's routing and transmission control functions into two discrete layers, which led to the splitting of TCP into the TCP and IP protocols.

Due to his experience in communication protocols such as TCP, several key researchers were greatly interested in recruiting him, including Bob Kahn's ARPANET team at DARPA, Ray Tomlinson at BBN, Bob Taylor's team at Xerox PARC, and Steve Crocker at the Information Sciences Institute (ISI). In early 1977, Dalal joined Robert Metcalfe's team at Xerox PARC, where he worked on the development of the Xerox Network Systems. He also worked on the 10Mbps Ethernet Specification at Xerox PARC, along with DEC and Intel, leading to the IEEE 802.3 LAN standard.

He later left Xerox, and became a founding member of the startup tech companies Claris and Metaphor Computer Systems in the early 1980s. He later became a managing partner of Mayfield, and joined the Board of Directors at several tech companies including Narus and Nuance. In 2005, he was recognized by Stanford as one of the pioneers of the Internet.

Peter Kirstein

Peter T. Kirstein (1933–2020) was a British computer scientist and a leader in the international development of the Internet. In 1973, he established one of the first two international nodes of the ARPANET. In 1978 he co-authored "Issues in packet-network interconnection" with Vint Cerf, one of the early technical papers on the internet concept. His research group at University College London adopted TCP/IP in 1982, a year ahead of ARPANET, and played a significant role in the very earliest experimental Internet work. Starting in 1983 he chaired the International Collaboration Board, which involved six NATO countries, served on the Networking Panel of the NATO Science Committee (serving as chair in 2001), and on Advisory Committees for the Australian Research Council, the Canadian Department of Communications, the German GMD, and the Indian Education and Research Network (ERNET) Project. He leads the Silk Project, which provides satellite-based Internet access to the Newly Independent States in the Southern Caucasus and Central Asia. In 2012, Kirstein was inducted into the Internet Hall of Fame by the Internet Society.

Steve Crocker

Steve Crocker (born 1944 in Pasadena, California) has worked in the ARPANET and Internet communities since their inception. As a UCLA graduate student in the 1960s, he helped create the ARPANET protocols which were the foundation for today's Internet. He created the Request for Comments (RFC) series, authoring the very first RFC and many more. He was instrumental in creating the ARPA "Network Working Group", the forerunner of the modern Internet Engineering Task Force.

Crocker has been a program manager at the Advanced Research Projects Agency (ARPA), a senior researcher at USC's Information Sciences Institute, founder and director of the Computer Science Laboratory at The Aerospace Corporation and a vice president at Trusted Information Systems. In 1994, Crocker was one of the founders and chief technology officer of CyberCash, Inc. He has also been an IETF security area director, a member of the Internet Architecture Board, chair of the Internet Corporation for Assigned Names and Numbers (ICANN) Security and Stability Advisory Committee, a board member of the Internet Society and numerous other Internet-related volunteer positions. Crocker is chair of the board of ICANN.

For this work, Crocker was awarded the 2002 IEEE Internet Award "for leadership in creation of key elements in open evolution of Internet protocols". In 2012, Crocker was inducted into the Internet Hall of Fame by the Internet Society.

Jon Postel

Jon Postel (1943–1998) was a researcher at the Information Sciences Institute. He was editor of all early Internet standards specifications, such as the RFC series. His beard and sandals made him "the most recognizable archetype of an Internet pioneer".

The Internet Society's Postel Award is named in his honor, as is the Postel Center at Information Sciences Institute. His obituary was written by Vint Cerf and published as RFC 2468 in remembrance of Postel and his work. In 2012, Postel was inducted into the Internet Hall of Fame by the Internet Society.

Joyce K. Reynolds

Joyce K. Reynolds (died 2015) was an American computer scientist and served as part of the editorial team of the RFC series from 1987 to 2006. She performed the IANA function with Jon Postel until this was transferred to ICANN, then worked with ICANN in this role until 2001, while remaining an employee of ISI.

As Area Director of the User Services area, she was a member of the Internet Engineering Steering Group of the IETF from 1990 to March 1998.

Together with Bob Braden, she received the 2006 Postel Award in recognition of her services to the Internet. She is mentioned, along with a brief biography, in RFC 1336, Who's Who in the Internet (1992).

Danny Cohen

Danny Cohen led several projects on real-time interactive applications over the ARPANet and the Internet starting in 1973. After serving on the computer science faculty at Harvard University (1969–1973) and Caltech (1976), he joined the Information Sciences Institute (ISI) at University of Southern California (USC). At ISI (1973–1993) he started many network related projects including, one to allow interactive, real-time speech over the ARPANet, packet-voice, packet-video, and Internet Concepts. In 1981 he adapted his visual flight simulator to run over the ARPANet, the first application of packet switching networks to real-time applications. In 1993, he worked on Distributed Interactive Simulation through several projects funded by United States Department of Defense. He is probably best known for his 1980 paper "On Holy Wars and a Plea for Peace"
which adopted the terminology of endianness for computing.

Cohen was elected to the National Academy of Engineering in 2006 for contributions to the advanced design, graphics, and real-time network protocols of computer systems and as an IEEE Fellow in 2010 for contributions to protocols for packet switching in real-time applications. In 1993 he received a United States Air Force Meritorious Civilian Service Award. And in 2012, Cohen was inducted into the Internet Hall of Fame by the Internet Society.

David J. Farber

Starting in the 1980s Dave Farber (born 1934) helped conceive and organize the major American research networks CSNET, NSFNET, and the National Research and Education Network (NREN). He helped create the NSF/DARPA-funded Gigabit Network Test bed Initiative and served as the Chairman of the Gigabit Test bed Coordinating Committee. He also served as Chief Technologist at the US Federal Communications Commission (2000–2001) and is a founding editor of ICANNWatch.

Farber is an IEEE Fellow, ACM Fellow, recipient of the 1995 SIGCOMM Award for vision and breadth of contributions to and inspiration of others in computer networks, distributed computing, and network infrastructure development, and the 1996 John Scott Award for seminal contributions to the field of computer networks and distributed computer systems. He served on the board of directors of the Electronic Frontier Foundation, the Electronic Privacy Information Center advisory board, the Board of Trustees of the Internet Society, and as a member of the Presidential Advisory Committee on High Performance Computing and Communications, Information Technology and Next Generation Internet.

On 3 August 2013, Farber was inducted into the Pioneers Circle of the Internet Hall of Fame for his key role in many systems that converged into today's Internet.

Paul Mockapetris

Paul V. Mockapetris (born 1948), while working with Jon Postel at the Information Sciences Institute (ISI) in 1983, proposed the Domain Name System (DNS) architecture. He was IETF chair from 1994 to 1996.

Mockapetris received the 1997 John C. Dvorak Telecommunications Excellence Award "Personal Achievement - Network Engineering" for DNS design and implementation, the 2003 IEEE Internet Award for his contributions to DNS, and the Distinguished Alumnus award from the University of California, Irvine. In May 2005, he received the ACM Sigcomm lifetime award. In 2012, Mockapetris was inducted into the Internet Hall of Fame by the Internet Society.

David Clark

David D. Clark (born 1944) is an American computer scientist. During the period of tremendous growth and expansion of the Internet from 1981 to 1989, he acted as chief protocol architect in the development of the Internet, and chaired the Internet Activities Board, which later became the Internet Architecture Board. He is currently a senior research scientist at the MIT Computer Science and Artificial Intelligence Laboratory.

In 1990 Clark was awarded the ACM SIGCOMM Award "in recognition of his major contributions to Internet protocol and architecture." In 1998 he received the IEEE Richard W. Hamming Medal "for leadership and major contributions to the architecture of the Internet as a universal information medium". In 2001 he was inducted as a Fellow of the Association for Computing Machinery for "his preeminent role in the development of computer communication and the Internet, including architecture, protocols, security, and telecommunications policy". In 2001, he was awarded the Telluride Tech Festival Award of Technology in Telluride, Colorado, and in 2011 the Lifetime Achievement Award from the Oxford Internet Institute, University of Oxford "in recognition of his intellectual and institutional contributions to the advance of the Internet."

Susan Estrada

Susan Estrada founded CERFnet, one of the original regional IP networks, in 1988. Through her leadership and collaboration with PSINet and UUnet, Estrada helped form the interconnection enabling the first commercial Internet traffic via the Commercial Internet Exchange. She wrote Connecting to the Internet in 1993 and she was inducted to the Internet Hall of Fame in 2014. She is on the Board of Trustees of the Internet Society.

Dave Mills

David L. Mills (born 1938) is an American computer engineer. Mills earned his PhD in Computer and Communication Sciences from the University of Michigan in 1971. While at Michigan he worked on the ARPA sponsored Conversational Use of Computers (CONCOMP) project and developed DEC PDP-8 based hardware and software to allow terminals to be connected over phone lines to an IBM System/360 mainframe computer.

Mills was the chairman of the Gateway Algorithms and Data Structures Task Force (GADS) and the first chairman of the Internet Architecture Task Force. He invented the Network Time Protocol (1981), the DEC LSI-11 based fuzzball router that was used for the 56 kbit/s NSFNET (1985), the Exterior Gateway Protocol (1984), and inspired the author of ping (1983). He is an emeritus professor at the University of Delaware.

In 1999 he was inducted as a Fellow of the Association for Computing Machinery, and in 2002, as a Fellow of the Institute of Electrical and Electronics Engineers (IEEE). In 2008, Mills was elected to the National Academy of Engineering (NAE). In 2013 he received the IEEE Internet Award "For significant leadership and sustained contributions in the research, development, standardization, and deployment of quality time synchronization capabilities for the Internet."

Radia Perlman

Radia Joy Perlman (born 1951) is the software designer and network engineer who developed the spanning-tree protocol which is fundamental to the operation of network bridges. She also played an important role in the development of link-state routing protocols such as IS-IS (which had a significant influence on OSPF). In 2010 she received the ACM SIGCOMM Award "for her fundamental contributions to the Internet routing and bridging protocols that we all use and take for granted every day."

Dennis M. Jennings

Dennis M. Jennings is an Irish physicist, academic, Internet pioneer, and venture capitalist. In 1984, the National Science Foundation (NSF) began construction of several regional supercomputing centers to provide very high-speed computing resources for the US research community. In 1985 NSF hired Jennings to lead the establishment of the National Science Foundation Network (NSFNET) to link five of the super-computing centers to enable sharing of resources and information. Jennings made three critical decisions that shaped the subsequent development of NSFNET: 
 that it would be a general-purpose research network, not limited to connection of the supercomputers; 
 it would act as the backbone for connection of regional networks at each supercomputing site; and 
 it would use the ARPANET's TCP/IP protocols.

Jennings was also actively involved in the start-up of research networks in Europe (European Academic Research Network, EARN - President; EBONE - Board member) and Ireland (HEAnet - initial proposal and later board member). He chaired the Board and General Assembly of the Council of European National Top Level Domain Registries (CENTR) from 1999 to early 2001 and was actively involved in the start-up of the Internet Corporation for Assigned Names and Numbers (ICANN). He was a member of the ICANN Board from 2007 to 2010, serving as vice-chair in 2009–2010. In April 2014 Jennings was inducted into the Internet Hall of Fame.

Steve Wolff

Stephen "Steve" Wolff participated in the development of ARPANET while working for the U.S. Army. In 1986 he became Division Director for Networking and Communications Research and Infrastructure at the National Science Foundation (NSF) where he managed the development of NSFNET. He also conceived the Gigabit Testbed, a joint NSF-DARPA project to prove the feasibility of IP networking at gigabit speeds. His work at NSF transformed the fledgling internet from a narrowly focused U.S. government project into the modern Internet with scholarly and commercial interest for the entire world. In 1994 he left NSF to join Cisco as a technical manager in Corporate Consulting Engineering. In 2011 he became the CTO at Internet2.

In 2002 the Internet Society recognized Wolff with its Postel Award. When presenting the award, Internet Society (ISOC) President and CEO Lynn St. Amour said "…Steve helped transform the Internet from an activity that served the specific goals of the research community to a worldwide enterprise which has energized scholarship and commerce throughout the world." The Internet Society also recognized Wolff in 1994 for his courage and leadership in advancing the Internet.

Sally Floyd

Sally Floyd (1950–2019) was an American engineer recognized for her extensive contributions to Internet architecture and her work in identifying practical ways to control and stabilize Internet congestion. She invented the random early detection active queue management scheme, which has been implemented in nearly all commercially available routers, and devised the now-common method of adding delay jitter to message timers to avoid synchronization collisions. Floyd, with Vern Paxson, in 1997 identified the lack of knowledge of network topology as the major obstacle in understanding how the Internet works. This paper, "Why We Don't Know How to Simulate the Internet", was re-published as "Difficulties in Simulating the Internet" in 2001 and won the IEEE Communication Society's William R. Bennett Prize Paper Award.

Floyd was also a co-author on the standard for TCP Selective acknowledgement (SACK), Explicit Congestion Notification (ECN), the Datagram Congestion Control Protocol (DCCP) and TCP Friendly Rate Control (TFRC).

She received the IEEE Internet Award in 2005 and the ACM SIGCOMM Award in 2007 for her contributions to congestion control. She has been involved in the Internet Advisory Board, and, as of 2007, was one of the top-ten most cited researchers in computer science.

Van Jacobson

Van Jacobson is an American computer scientist, best known for his work on TCP/IP network performance and scaling. His work redesigning TCP/IP's flow control algorithms (Jacobson's algorithm) to better handle congestion is said to have saved the Internet from collapsing in the late 1980s and early 1990s. He is also known for the TCP/IP Header Compression protocol described in RFC 1144: Compressing TCP/IP Headers for Low-Speed Serial Links, popularly known as Van Jacobson TCP/IP Header Compression. He is co-author of several widely used network diagnostic tools, including traceroute, tcpdump, and pathchar. He was a leader in the development of the multicast backbone (MBone) and the multimedia tools vic, vat, and wb.

For his work, Jacobson received the 2001 ACM SIGCOMM Award for Lifetime Achievement, the 2003 IEEE Koji Kobayashi Computers and Communications Award, and was elected to the National Academy of Engineering in 2006. In 2012, Jacobson was inducted into the Internet Hall of Fame by the Internet Society.

Ted Nelson

Theodor Holm "Ted" Nelson (born 1937) is an American sociologist and philosopher. In 1960 he founded Project Xanadu with the goal of creating a computer network with a simple user interface. Project Xanadu was to be a worldwide electronic publishing system using hypertext linking that would have created a universal library. In 1963 he coined the terms "hypertext" and "hypermedia". In 1974 he wrote and published two books in one, Computer Lib/Dream Machines, that has been hailed as "the most important book in the history of new media." His grand ideas from the 1960s and 1970s never became completed projects.

Tim Berners-Lee

Timothy John "Tim" Berners-Lee (born 1955) is a British physicist and computer scientist. In 1980, while working at CERN, he proposed a project using hypertext to facilitate sharing and updating information among researchers. While there, he built a prototype system named ENQUIRE. Back at CERN in 1989 he conceived of and, in 1990, together with Robert Cailliau, created the first client and server implementations for what became the World Wide Web. Berners-Lee is the director of the World Wide Web Consortium (W3C), a standards organization which oversees and encourages the Web's continued development, co-director of the Web Science Trust, and founder of the World Wide Web Foundation.

In 1994, Berners-Lee became one of only six members of the World Wide Web Hall of Fame. In 2004, Berners-Lee was knighted by Queen Elizabeth II for his pioneering work. In April 2009, he was elected a foreign associate of the United States National Academy of Sciences, based in Washington, D.C. In 2012, Berners-Lee was inducted into the Internet Hall of Fame by the Internet Society.

Robert Cailliau

Robert Cailliau (born 1947), is a Belgian informatics engineer and computer scientist who, working with Tim Berners-Lee and Nicola Pellow at CERN, developed the World Wide Web. In 2012 he was inducted into the Internet Hall of Fame by the Internet Society.

Nicola Pellow

Nicola Pellow, one of the nineteen members of the WWW Project at CERN working with Tim Berners-Lee, is recognized for developing the first cross-platform internet browser, Line Mode Browser, that displayed web-pages on dumb terminals and was released in May 1991. She joined the project in November 1990, while an undergraduate math student enrolled in a sandwich course at Leicester Polytechnic (now De Montfort University). She left CERN at the end of August 1991, but returned after graduating in 1992, and worked with Robert Cailliau on MacWWW, the first web browser for the classic Mac OS.

Mark P. McCahill

Mark P. McCahill (born 1956) is an American programmer and systems architect. While working at the University of Minnesota he led the development of the Gopher protocol (1991), the effective predecessor of the World Wide Web, and contributed to the development and popularization of a number of other Internet technologies from the 1980s.

Marc Andreessen

Marc L. Andreessen (born 1971) is an American software engineer, entrepreneur, and investor. Working with Eric Bina while at NCSA, he co-authored Mosaic, the first widely used web browser. He is also co-founder of Netscape Communications Corporation.

Eric Bina

Eric J. Bina (born 1964) is an American computer programmer. In 1993, together with Marc Andreessen, he authored the first version of Mosaic while working at NCSA at the University of Illinois at Urbana–Champaign. Mosaic is famed as the first killer application that popularized the Internet. He is also a co-founder of Netscape Communications Corporation.

Birth of the Internet plaque
A plaque commemorating the "Birth of the Internet" was dedicated at a conference on the history and future of the internet on 28 July 2005 and is displayed at the Gates Computer Science Building, Stanford University. The text printed and embossed in black into the brushed bronze surface of the plaque reads:

BIRTH OF THE INTERNET

THE ARCHITECTURE OF THE INTERNET AND THE DESIGN OF
THE CORE NETWORKING PROTOCOL TCP (WHICH LATER BECAME TCP/IP)
WERE CONCEIVED BY VINTON G. CERF AND ROBERT E. KAHN DURING 1973
WHILE CERF WAS AT STANFORD'S DIGITAL SYSTEMS LABORATORY AND
KAHN WAS AT ARPA (LATER DARPA). IN THE SUMMER OF 1976, CERF LEFT STANFORD
TO MANAGE THE PROGRAM WITH KAHN AT ARPA.

THEIR WORK BECAME KNOWN IN SEPTEMBER 1973 AT A NETWORKING CONFERENCE IN ENGLAND.
CERF AND KAHN'S SEMINAL PAPER WAS PUBLISHED IN MAY 1974.

CERF, YOGEN K. DALAL, AND CARL SUNSHINE
WROTE THE FIRST FULL TCP SPECIFICATION IN DECEMBER 1974.
WITH THE SUPPORT OF DARPA, EARLY IMPLEMENTATIONS OF TCP (AND IP LATER)
WERE TESTED BY BOLT BERANEK AND NEWMAN (BBN),
STANFORD, AND UNIVERSITY COLLEGE LONDON DURING 1975.

BBN BUILT THE FIRST INTERNET GATEWAY, NOW KNOWN AS A ROUTER, TO LINK NETWORKS TOGETHER.
IN SUBSEQUENT YEARS, RESEARCHERS AT MIT AND USC-ISI, AMONG MANY OTHERS,
PLAYED KEY ROLES IN THE DEVELOPMENT OF THE SET OF INTERNET PROTOCOLS.

KEY STANFORD RESEARCH ASSOCIATES AND FOREIGN VISITORS

VINTON CERF 
DAG BELSNES  JAMES MATHIS
RONALD CRANE JUNIOR  BOB METCALFE
YOGEN DALAL  DARRYL RUBIN
JUDITH ESTRIN  JOHN SHOCH
RICHARD KARP  CARL SUNSHINE

GERARD LE LANN  KUNINOBU TANNO

DARPA
 ROBERT KAHN

COLLABORATING GROUPS

BOLT BERANEK AND NEWMAN
WILLIAM PLUMMER • GINNY STRAZISAR •  RAY TOMLINSON

MIT
NOEL CHIAPPA • DAVID CLARK • STEPHEN KENT • DAVID P. REED

NDRE
YNGVAR LUNDH • PAAL SPILLING

UNIVERSITY COLLEGE LONDON
FRANK DEIGNAN • MARTINE GALLAND • PETER HIGGINSON
ANDREW HINCHLEY • PETER KIRSTEIN • ADRIAN STOKES

USC-ISI
ROBERT BRADEN • DANNY COHEN • DANIEL LYNCH • JON POSTEL

ULTIMATELY, THOUSANDS IF NOT TENS TO HUNDREDS OF THOUSANDS
HAVE CONTRIBUTED THEIR EXPERTISE TO THE EVOLUTION OF THE INTERNET.

DEDICATED 28 July 2005

See also

 History of the Internet
 History of hypertext
 History of the World Wide Web
 IEEE Internet Award
 Internet Hall of Fame

References

External links
 Internet Hall of Fame, established by the Internet Society in April 2012.
 RFC 1336: Who's Who in the Internet: Biographies of Internet Activities Board (IAB), Internet Engineering Steering Group (IESG), and the Internet Research Steering Group (IRSG) of the Internet Research Task Force (IRTF) Members, G. Malkin, IETF, May 1992.
 "Past IESG Members and IETF Chairs", IETF web site
 "A Brief History of the Internet Advisory / Activities / Architecture Board" from the IAB web site includes historical lists of IAB Members, IAB Chairs, IAB Ex-Officio and Liaison Members (IETF Chairs), IRTF Chairs, RFC Editors, and much more historical information.
 "Internet Pioneers", web pages at ibiblio.org, a collaboration of the School of Information and Library Science and the School of Journalism and Mass Communication at the University of North Carolina at Chapel Hill.
 "Pioneers Gallery", from the Who Is Who in the Internet World (WiWiW) web site.
 "The Greatest Internet Pioneers You Never Heard Of: The Story of Erwise and Four Finns Who Showed the Way to the Web Browser", Juha-Pekka Tikka, 3 March 2009, Xconomy web page.

Oral histories

  Focuses on Kahn's role in the development of computer networking from 1967 through the early 1980s. Beginning with his work at Bolt Beranek and Newman (BBN), Kahn discusses his involvement as the ARPANET proposal was being written and then implemented, and his role in the public demonstration of the ARPANET. The interview continues into Kahn's involvement with networking when he moves to IPTO in 1972, where he was responsible for the administrative and technical evolution of the ARPANET, including programs in packet radio, the development of a new network protocol (TCP/IP), and the switch to TCP/IP to connect multiple networks.
  Cerf describes his involvement with the ARPA network, and his relationships with Bolt Beranek and Newman, Robert Kahn, Lawrence Roberts, and the Network Working Group.
  Baran describes his work at RAND, and discusses his interaction with the group at ARPA who were responsible for the later development of the ARPANET.
  Kleinrock discusses his work on the ARPANET.
  The interview focuses on Robert's work at the Information Processing Techniques Office (IPTO) at ARPA including discussion of ARPA and IPTO support of research in computer science, computer networks, and artificial intelligence, the ARPANET, the involvement of universities with ARPA and IPTO, J. C. R. Licklider, Ivan Sutherland, Steve Lukasik, Wesley Clark, as well as the development of computing at the Massachusetts Institute of Technology and Lincoln Laboratory.
  Focuses on McCahill's work at the University of Minnesota where he led the team that created Gopher, the popular client/server software for organizing and sharing information on the Internet as well as his work on development of Pop Mail, Gopher VR, Forms Nirvana, the Electronic Grants Management System, and the University of Minnesota Portal.

 
History of the Internet
Lists of computer scientists
People in information technology